The Communauté de communes du Bray-Normand (before 2015: Communauté de communes du Canton de Gournay-en-Bray) was located in the Seine-Maritime and Eure département of the Normandy region of northern France. It was created on 31 December 2001. It was merged into the new Communauté de communes des 4 rivières in January 2017.

Participants 
The Communauté de communes comprised the following 18 communes:

Avesnes-en-Bray
Bézancourt
Bosc-Hyons
Bouchevilliers
Brémontier-Merval
Cuy-Saint-Fiacre
Dampierre-en-Bray
Doudeauville
Elbeuf-en-Bray
Ernemont-la-Villette
Ferrières-en-Bray
Gancourt-Saint-Étienne
Gournay-en-Bray
Martagny
Ménerval
Molagnies
Montroty
Neuf-Marché

See also
Communes of the Seine-Maritime department

References 

Bray-Normand
Bray-Normand